Lolong (died 10 February 2013) was the largest crocodile in captivity.

In November 2011, Australian crocodile expert Adam Britton of National Geographic sedated and measured Lolong in his enclosure and confirmed him as the world's largest crocodile ever caught and placed in captivity.

Lolong died on 10 February 2013 from pneumonia and cardiac arrest.

Capture and habitat
Lolong was caught in a Bunawan creek in the province of Agusan del Sur in the Philippines on 3 September 2011. He was captured with the joint cooperation of the local government unit, residents, and crocodile hunters of Palawan.

Hunted over a period of three weeks, it took around 100 people to bring him onto land. He became aggressive at several points during the capture, and twice broke restraining ropes before eventually being properly secured. He was estimated to be at least 50 years old.

Lolong was suspected of eating a fisherman who went missing in the town of Bunawan, and also of consuming a 12-year-old girl whose head was discovered two years earlier. He was also the primary suspect in the disappearance of water buffaloes in the known area. In the examination of the stomach contents after his capture, no remnants of water buffaloes reported missing before Lolong's capture were found, nor human remains.

The nongovernmental organization activist Animal Kingdom Foundation Inc., with the cooperation of People for the Ethical Treatment of Animals, had urged the local government of Bunawan to return Lolong to the creek of barangay Nueva Era, where the giant reptile was captured. But, in an ongoing debate, Bunawan mayor Edwin "Cox" Elorde and residents of the barangay opposed the crocodile's release, arguing that Lolong would threaten individuals living in the vicinity of the creek.

Name
The crocodile was named after Ernesto "Lolong" Goloran Coñate as one of the veteran crocodile hunters from the Palawan Crocodile and Wildlife Reservation Center, who led the hunt. After weeks of stalking, the hunt for Lolong took its toll on Coñate's health. He died of a heart attack several days before the crocodile was captured.

Captivity and display
Bunawan made Lolong the centerpiece of an ecotourism park for species found in the marshlands near the township. Mayor Elorde said, "We will take care of this crocodile because this will boost our tourism and we know it can help in terms of town's income and jobs to our village communities."

The giant crocodile was kept in an enclosure in the Bunawan Ecopark and Wildlife Reservation Center in Barangay Consuelo located 8 km from town. The exhibit was opened to the public on 17 September 2011, after permission was received from the Palawan Wildlife and Conservation Center. The Bunawan Municipal Council subsequently passed an ordinance regulating and imposing fees on gate entrance, parking, and other fees at the ecopark where the celebrity giant crocodile resided in captivity.

The ecopark charged a P20 entrance fee for adults and P15 for children, which supported the park's maintenance and procurement of Lolong's food. The Bunawan Ecopark also incurred expenses for electricity, maintenance, and other incidental expenses, such as installation of CCTV cameras. According to Bunawan Mayor Elorde, up to 26 October 2011, the celebrity crocodile had already earned nearly half million pesos in donations, entrance fees, and parking fees, with a daily income of about P10,000 that month.

Record holder
Experts from the National Geographic Channel found out that Lolong breaks the record of the previous record-holder: a  male saltwater crocodile named Cassius kept in the crocodile park of MarineLand Melanesia in Queensland, Australia.
The certification was read in public during Bunawan's annual local festival, Araw Ng Bunawan (Bunawan Day).

Bunawan Ecopark and Research Center plans
Bunawan Media Affairs Coordinator Welinda Asis-Elorde said the local government unit, through a private-public partnership project, will be embarking on a P200-million site development project for the Bunawan Ecopark and Research Center. 

"You have more than 5,000 crocodiles, some of them are giants bigger even than Lolong at Agusan Marsh here in Bunawan, therefore we need a longer plan for more visitors to come and visit this homeland of the giants. We are embarking on this P200-million project now and for future generations", she said. 

Bunawan Municipal Planning & Development Officer Robert Floyd Salise, told PNA in an interview that the project will include the construction of cottages, lodging houses or inns, swimming pools, an amphitheatre, laboratory and research center, souvenir shops, pavilion, and other amenities.

Death and storage of remains

Lolong was found dead inside his compound at around 8:00p.m. on 10 February 2013. The necropsy revealed he had died of pneumonia and cardiac arrest, which was aggravated by a fungal infection and stress. It is believed by some activists and experts that captivity contributed to or even caused his death, as the pool would frequently be drained to allow visitors a better look at him. The lack of water caused stress on Lolong, as large crocodiles often need to spend a large amount of time in water to alleviate the stress their weight puts on their body. This lack of water added stress and helped damage his internal organs, potentially leading to his death. His remains were preserved by taxidermy at Philippine National Museum of Natural History.

References

External links

2013 animal deaths
Individual crocodiles
Deaths from pneumonia in the Philippines
Agusan del Sur
2011 in the Philippines
2013 in the Philippines
Individual animals in the Philippines
Individual taxidermy exhibits
Year of birth missing
Place of birth missing